Microlophus pacificus, the common Pacific iguana, is a species of lava lizard endemic to the Galapagos island of Pinta. The species is commonly attributed to the genus Microlophus but has been attributed to the genus Tropidurus.

References

pacificus
Endemic reptiles of the Galápagos Islands
Lizards of South America
Reptiles of Ecuador
Reptiles described in 1876
Taxa named by Franz Steindachner